The Chalke Gate was the main ceremonial entrance to the Great Palace of Constantinople in the Byzantine period.

Chalke may also refer to:

Places 
Chalki, an island near Rhodes in Greece
Heybeliada, one of the Princes' Islands in the Marmara Sea, known as Chalke in Byzantine times

People with the surname
Sarah Chalke (born 1976), Canadian actress
Stephen Chalke (born 1948), English author and publisher
Steve Chalke (born 1955), British Christian leader

Other uses
River Chalke, Wiltshire, England

See also
Chalk (disambiguation)